This is a list of years in the Central African Republic. See also the timeline of Central African history.  For only articles about years in the Central African Republic that have been written, see :Category:Years in the Central African Republic.

Twenty-first century

Twentieth century

Nineteenth century

Eighteenth century

Seventeenth century

Sixteenth century

See also
 Timeline of Central African history
 Timeline of Bangui
 List of years by country

Bibliography

External links
 

 
Central African Republic
years